Ølsted is a small village in Aarhus Municipality, near the east coast of the Central Denmark Region, Denmark.

The village has Ølsted Church. Students from Ølsted, up to grade 9, attend Bakkegårdsskolen in Trige.

The town has a common postal district (8380) with Trige and Spørring.

There may have been a manor house in the village during the 14th century, as Jens Peter Trap, in his seminal Statistical-Topographical Description of the Kingdom of Denmark (1904, 3rd edition, if not earlier editions), includes "Johannes Pedersen of Ølsted is mentioned in 1356".

Gallery

References

Towns and settlements in Aarhus Municipality